The 2012 Real Salt Lake season is the team's eighth year of existence. The team's first game was on March 10 at the Home Depot Center against the Los Angeles Galaxy, which they won 3-1.

Background

Review

Competitions

Preseason

Desert Diamond Cup

Standings

Results

Major League Soccer

League standings 
Western Conference

Overall

Results summary

Results by round

Regular season

Playoffs 

 Seattle Sounders won on 1 - 0 aggregate

U.S. Open Cup

CONCACAF Champions League

Roster & Transfers

Roster 
Roster on September 27, 2012.

In

MLS Drafts

Out

Loan in

Loan out

Miscellany

Allocation ranking 
Real Salt Lake is in the #17 position in the MLS Allocation Ranking. The allocation ranking is the mechanism used to determine which MLS club has first priority to acquire a U.S. National Team player who signs with MLS after playing abroad, or a former MLS player who returns to the league after having gone to a club abroad for a transfer fee. A ranking can be traded, provided that part of the compensation received in return is another club's ranking.

International roster spots 
Real Salt Lake has 6 MLS International Roster Slots for use in the 2012 season. Each club in Major League Soccer is allocated 8 international roster spots and Real Salt Lake has traded away two spots permanently, one to Chivas USA in 2004 and the other to Colorado Rapids in 2005.

Future draft pick trades 
Future picks acquired: *2013 MLS SuperDraft Round 3 pick from D.C. United; *Unspecified year conditional draft pick from Seattle Sounders FC.
Future picks traded: *2013 MLS SuperDraft conditional pick to Vancouver Whitecaps FC; *2014 MLS SuperDraft round 4 pick to Chicago Fire; *2014 MLS SuperDraft conditional pick to Montreal Impact.

References 

Real Salt Lake
Real Salt Lake seasons
Real Salt Lake